Lach, Lyakh or Ljach is a surname. It was used by East Slavs to refer to Poles. Ethnic Poles in Nowy Sącz (south-eastern Poland) also used the name, referring to themselves as Lachy Sądeckie. According to Paweł Jasienica, it derives from the name of an ancient Polish tribe, the Lendians. Due to population resettlements of ethnic Poles after the Soviet annexation of eastern Polish territories (see Kresy), it is slightly more frequent in western Poland. Over 10,000 people have this surname in Poland.
In the Czech Republic and Slovakia, Lach served as a short form of the personal name Ladislav. It is also a variant of Lah, a Slovene word for Vlachs.

Notable people with the name include:
 Andrei Lyakh (born 1990), Russian footballer
 Elmer Lach (born 1918), Polish-Canadian ice hockey player
 Günter Lach (1954—2021), German politicians
 Juan Sebastian Lach (born 1970), Mexican composer

See also 
 Lech (name)
 Polish name
 Lendians

References

Polish-language surnames